Willy Dozan, formerly known by his stage name Billy Chong (born Chuang Chen Li (庄陈力), February 10, 1957, Magelang, Indonesia) is an Indonesian martial artist, actor and stuntman. His acting career started in 1977 with Pembalasan Si Pitung (Pitung's Revenge). He pursued his career in Indonesia, Hong Kong and the United States. Some of the most notable roles are in Crystal Fist and A Fistful of Talons. In 1995, he became a household name in Indonesia after performing in Deru Debu, a popular TV series, for which he directed most of the episodes. He also starred in, directed and produced another hit TV series, Sapu Jagad (2000).

In 1990, Dozan married Indonesian popstar Betharia Sonata, but they divorced in 2002. The couple has two children. His son, Leon Dozan, is also an actor.

Partial filmography

Actor
  Target  (2018)
 Akhir Sebuah Cinta (2001) TV series
 Sapu Jagad (2000) TV series
 Deru Debu (1995) TV series (as Igo)
 Narkoba (1992)
 Rio Sang Juara (1989) (as Rio)
 Pernikahan Berdarah (1990)
 Aces Go Places 5: The Terracotta Hit (1990)
 A Fistful Of Talons (1983) (as Li)
 Pendekar Liar (1983)
 Kung Fu From Beyond The Grave (1982) 
 Wu Long Tian Shi Zhao Ji Gui or Kung Fu Zombie (1981) (as Pang)
 Super Power (1980)
 Shou Zhi Niu Chu (1980) aka Kung Fu Executioner 
 Crystal Fist (1979) aka Jade Claw
 Sun Dragon (1979) aka A Hard Way To Die
 Balada Dua Jagoan (1979)
 Invincible Monkey Fist (1978)
 Pembalasan si Pitung (1977)

Director
 Tanpa Saksi Mata (2003) TV series
 7 Tanda Cinta (2002) TV series
 Dari Mana Datangnya Cinta (2001) TV series
 Sapu Jagad (2000) TV series
 Deru Debu (1995) TV series

References

External links 
 

Living people
Converts to Islam
Indonesian male television actors
Indonesian people of Chinese descent
Indonesian Cantonese people
1957 births